Bonjour Holdings Limited is a Hong Kong-based investment holding company principally engaged in the sales of beauty products.

The company was founded in 1991. Its first branch was located in the Jordan area of Hong Kong. The company was listed on the Hong Kong Stock Exchange in 2003. As of 2019, the chain has 39 retail stores in Hong Kong (35), Macau (3), and Guangzhou (1).

Bonjour's annual revenue totaled HK$1.79 billion for the fiscal year ending in December 2018.

See also
 Sa Sa International Holdings

References

External links
 

 

Companies listed on the Hong Kong Stock Exchange
Retail companies of Hong Kong
Retail companies established in 1991
1991 establishments in Hong Kong
Hong Kong brands
Holding companies of Hong Kong